Cathal Goulding (2 January 1923 – 26 December 1998) was Chief of Staff of the Irish Republican Army and the Official IRA.

Early life and career
One of seven children born on East Arran Street in north Dublin to an Irish republican family, as a teenager Goulding joined Fianna Éireann, the youth wing of the Irish Republican Army (IRA). He joined the IRA in 1939. In December of that year, he took part in a raid on Irish Army ammunition stores in Phoenix Park, Dublin; and in November 1941 he was gaoled for a year in Mountjoy Prison for membership of an unlawful organisation and possession of IRA documents. On his release in 1942, he was immediately interned at the Curragh Camp, where he remained until 1944.

Goulding was involved in 1945 in attempts to re-establish the IRA, which had been badly affected by the authorities in both the Irish Free State and Northern Ireland. He was among twenty-five to thirty men who met at O'Neill's pub, Pearse Street, to try to re-establish the IRA in Dublin. He organised the first national meeting of IRA activists after the Second World War, in Dublin in 1946. The gathering was raided by the Garda Síochána and Goulding along with John Joe McGirl and ten others was sentenced to twelve months in prison.

Upon his release in 1947, Goulding organised IRA training camps in the Wicklow Mountains. He took charge of the IRA's Dublin Brigade in 1951. In 1953, he (along with Seán Mac Stíofáin and Manus Canning) was involved in an arms raid on the Officers' Training Corps armoury at Felsted School in Essex. The three were arrested and sentenced with eight-year prison terms, but were released in 1959 after serving only six years at Pentonville, Wakefield and Stafford prisons. In 1956, an attempt was made by the IRA to free Goulding from Wakefield Prison, but this was aborted when alarms were sounded at the prison. During his time in Wakefield prison, he befriended EOKA members and Klaus Fuchs, a German-born spy who had passed information about the US nuclear programme to the Soviet Union. In so doing, Goulding became interested in the Russian Revolution.

Chief of staff

He was appointed IRA Quartermaster General in 1959, and in 1962 succeeded Ruairí Ó Brádaigh as IRA Chief of Staff. In February 1966, together with Seán Garland, Goulding was arrested for possession of a revolver and ammunition; in total he spent sixteen years in British and Irish jails.

Goulding was instrumental in moving the IRA to the left in the 1960s. He argued against the policy of abstentionism and developed a Marxist analysis of Irish politics. He believed the British state deliberately divided the Irish working class on sectarian grounds, in order to exploit them and keep them from uniting and overthrowing their bourgeois oppressors. This analysis was rejected by those who later went on to form the Provisional IRA after the 1969 IRA split. In August 1969 Goulding issued a statement that IRA men had been moved into Northern Ireland to defend Catholics that had been "terrorized by mobs backed by armed B-Specials." (The B-Specials were part of a reserve police force formed in 1920). Gouldings statement went on to warn that British Troops must not be "used to suppress the legitimate attempts of the people to defend themselves against the B-Specials and the sectarian Orange (Protestant) murder gangs."   

He remained Chief of Staff of what became known as the Official IRA until 1972. Although the Official IRA, like the Provisional IRA, carried out an armed campaign, Goulding argued that such action ultimately divided the Irish working class. After public revulsion at the shooting death of William Best, a Catholic from Derry who was a British soldier, and the bombing of the Aldershot barracks, the Official IRA announced a ceasefire in 1972.

Goulding was prominent in the various stages of Official Sinn Féin's development into the Workers' Party. He was also involved in the anti-amendment campaign in opposition to the introduction of a constitutional ban on abortion, along with his partner, Moira Woods. In 1992, however, he objected to the political reforms proposed by party leader Proinsias De Rossa, and remained in the Workers' Party after the formation of Democratic Left. He regarded Democratic Left as having compromised socialism in the pursuit of political office.

Last years and death
In his later years, Goulding spent much of his time at his cottage in Raheenleigh near Myshall, County Carlow. He died of cancer in his native Dublin, and was survived by three sons and a daughter. He was cremated and his ashes scattered, at his directive, at the site known as "the Nine Stones" on the slopes of Mount Leinster.

References

Sources

T. E. Utley, The Lessons of Ulster (1975) (Friends of the Union, 1997)
The Workers' Party, "Cathal Goulding: Thinker, Socialist, Republican, Revolutionary, 1923–1998", (1999).

External links

1923 births
1998 deaths
Deaths from cancer in the Republic of Ireland
Irish Marxists
Irish Republican Army (1922–1969) members
Irish republicans
Official Irish Republican Army members
People from County Carlow
Politicians from Dublin (city)
Republicans imprisoned during the Northern Ireland conflict
Workers' Party (Ireland) politicians